Coyne is a surname of Irish origin anglicised from the Gaelic Ó Cadhain meaning "descendant of Cadhan".

Notable people with the surname include:

Andre Coyne, dam engineer
Andrew Coyne, journalist
Bernard Coyne (bishop), Bishop of Elphin from 1913 to 1926
Bernard Coyne (giant) (1897–1921), American who is one of only 20 individuals in medical history to have stood 8 feet (240 cm) or more
Brian Coyne (born 1959), Scottish (soccer) football player and manager
Christopher Coyne (disambiguation), multiple people
Christopher J. Coyne (born 1958), bishop of the Roman Catholic Diocese of Burlington, Vermont
Christopher Coyne (professor) (born 1977), professor of economics
Chris Coyne (born 1978), Australian (soccer) footballer
 Chris Coyne, co-founded the websites OkCupid, keybase and SparkNotes
Dale Coyne, auto racer
Danny Coyne, footballer
Deborah Coyne, lawyer, professor and author
Frank J. Coyne, CEO of Insurance Services Office, Inc.
Gary Coyne (born 1961), Australian rugby league footballer
George Coyne, priest and astronomer
James Coyne (disambiguation), several people
James Bowes Coyne, Canadian lawyer and jurist, son of J. Henry
James C. Coyne (born 1947), American psychologist
James Elliott Coyne (1910–2012), governor of the Bank of Canada, son of J. Bowes
James Henry Coyne (1849–1942), Canadian lawyer and historian
James K. Coyne III (born 1946), U.S. Representative from Pennsylvania
Jamie Coyne (born 1982), Australian (soccer) footballer, brother of Chris Coyne
Jeanne Coyne, Broadway dancer and choreographer
Jerry Coyne, American professor of biology
John Coyne (disambiguation), several people
John Coyne (politician) (1836–1873), Canadian barrister and politician
John Coyne (writer) (born 1937), American writer of horror novels
John Henry Coyne aka Harry Coyne (1865–1926), Queensland politician
John M. Coyne (1916–2014), former mayor of Brooklyn, Ohio
John Coyne (footballer) (born 1951), English-born football (soccer) player who played for Australia
John N. Coyne (1839–1907), American Civil War soldier
Joseph Coyne, American stage actor who achieved fame in musical comedy
Joseph Stirling Coyne, Prolific British playwright from the mid-nineteenth century
Joshua Coyne, American classical musician
Kevin Coyne, composer, writer and painter
Mark Coyne (musician), American musician
Mark Coyne (rugby league), Australian rugby league footballer
Máirtín Ó Cadhain, Irish-language modernist writer
Michael L. Coyne, Associate Dean and Law Professor at the Massachusetts School of Law
Paul Coyne, TV & film producer
Peter Coyne (disambiguation), several people with that name
Peter Coyne (footballer) (born 1958), English footballer
Peter Coyne (politician) (1917–2001), Australian politician
Peter Coyne (rugby league) (born 1964), Australian rugby league player
Richard Coyne, Professor of Architectural Computing
Thelma Coyne, tennis player
Wayne Coyne, musician
William J. Coyne, American politician
Evan Coyne Maloney, documentary filmmaker and video blogger

Fictional characters
Declan Coyne, in Degrassi: The Next Generation
Fiona Coyne, in Degrassi: The Next Generation

Surnames of Irish origin